Just the Two of Us is a British television reality singing contest hosted by Vernon Kay and Tess Daly, to date the only show that the couple have worked together on. The first series of the BBC show saw eight celebrities team up with professional singers and sing each night in duets, with one pair being eliminated every night. After each performance they were judged by a panel of industry experts. The basic format of the show was first used in another BBC programme, Strictly Come Dancing. It was cancelled in April 2007 after two series.

Format 
During the week-long run each day all the celebrities perform a duet with a professional singer. The judges then give comments on each performance. Once the contestants have returned to the "Green Room" (Backstage), the judges each then each give the couple a score from 1 to 10. The scores create a leaderboard which forms 50% of the final result, the other half comes from the public vote via telephone and text entries.

Once the scores and votes are combined to form the final leaderboard for that day's show, the two couples at the bottom compete in a final "Sing Off", where they perform their duet again. Once both couples have performed their song for the judging panel, the four judges decide on who deserves to stay and cast their votes. The couple with the most votes from the judges leaves the show that day.

So far there have been two series, the first won by Russell Watson and Sian Reeves and the second was won by Hannah Waterman and Marti Pellow.

Only four professionals have performed in both series - Natasha Hamilton, Alexander O'Neal, Jocelyn Brown and Beverly Knight.

The panel of judges were seen as four industry professionals. The judges for series one were singer Lulu, singer and musician Stewart Copeland, celebrity vocal coach CeCe Sammy and radio DJ Trevor Nelson. In 2007 for series two, Lulu was replaced by Jackson Five star Tito Jackson. Sammy, Nelson and Copeland all returned for series two.  Tara McDonald the well known UK dance vocalist was on backing vocal duty for both series.

Series 1 
The first series began on 24 February 2006 and ended on 5 March 2006.

Notes
  Watson replaced Rick Astley after Astley was unable to continue as his partner Lene Bausager had been nominated for an Oscar and the awards ceremony clashed with filming for the show.

The Judges 
 Trevor Nelson
 Lulu
 Cece Sammy
 Stewart Copeland
Contestants received vocal coaching by Joshua Alamu.

Series 2
The second and final series began on 2 January 2007 and ended on 7 January 2007.

Singer Russell Watson was originally supposed to be participating on the series with Hollyoaks actress, Loui Batley. However, after having had surgery to remove a tumour from his brain, he decided to pull out of the competition. Unlike the previous year, however, he was not replaced, so Batley was also dropped from the show.

Jo O'Meara did not participate in the second series as she was taking part in Channel 4's Celebrity Big Brother at the time.

Contestants received vocal coaching by Joshua Alamu.

The Judges 
The judges were:
 Trevor Nelson
 Stewart Copeland
 Cece Sammy
 Tito Jackson

Judges' scoring summary
Bold scores indicate the highest for that week. Red indicates the lowest score. * indicates the couple was in the bottom two or three.

International versions
These versions of the format are distributed by BBC Worldwide, the commercial arm of the BBC.

 Currently airing franchise
 Status unknown
 Franchise with an upcoming season
 Franchise no longer in production

References

External links

2000s British reality television series
2006 British television series debuts
2007 British television series endings
BBC Television shows
Singing competitions